Sándor Takács (born 20 August 1947) is a Hungarian former handball player who competed in the 1972 Summer Olympics.

He was born in Budapest.

In 1972 he was part of the Hungarian team which finished eighth in the Olympic tournament. He played all six matches.

External links
 profile

1947 births
Living people
Hungarian male handball players
Olympic handball players of Hungary
Handball players at the 1972 Summer Olympics
Handball players from Budapest